Craig Davies (born 15 November 1960) is a British racing driver currently competing in the FIA Masters Historic Racing, Goodwood Revival events and 6 hours of Spa. He races for the SZ Motorsport Team who run a number of historic cars including an ex works Alan Mann Mustang, Ford GT40, Boss Mustang and Corvette Stingray[2].  He is also an entrepreneur and runs Sub-Zero Wolf for UK/Europe.

Racing career 
Davies started Kart Racing in the UK 100 national A 1983-1985 then 1997-1999 and saloon cars from 1987 taking many fastest laps and podiums, winning the Falken Modified Production Saloon Championship in 1995. In 2010 he started the SZ Motorsport racing team and raced saloon cars including RS500 Cosworth and Britcar racing series in the UK. with numerous wins including the Masters Historic 2016. Other wins include 25 April 2012 win in the Britcar Production Cup race at Donington Park with co-driver Adam Jones. and the 2012 Silverstone Classic on 22 July 2012. Davies regularly competes in the 24Hr Silverstone, Spa 6 Hr, Goodwood Revival and Members meetings with co drivers including Derek Bell, Jason Plato, Robb Gravett, Oliver Gavin.

Results

Drivers 
Davies has co-driven a number of cars with British racing drivers including Derek Bell, Jason Plato, Rob Gravett and Oliver Gavin. He has also co-driven with the Alan Mann's son Henry Mann in his fathers Ford GT40 now owned and run by SZ Motorsport

Personal life 
Davies was born in Romford, Essex, England, and was educated at Nevin Drive. He is married to Sandy and they have a son Miles. He runs Sub-Zero Wolf  and is a supporter of the Haven House Charity.

References

External links
 Homepage
 Sub-Zero Motor Sports
 Sub-Zero Wolf

English businesspeople in retailing
English racing drivers
Living people
1960 births
24H Series drivers